Gregorio di Montelongo (or da Monte Longo; c. 1200 – 1269) was the Bishop of Tripoli from 1249 until 1251 and the Patriarch of Aquileia from 1251 until his death.

Gregorio was born in Ferentino into a family related to the counts of Segni, original of Montelongo in Molise. He was papal legate in Lombardy since 1238, where he led the Guelph coalition against emperor Frederick II. In 1247 he was sent by Pope Innocent IV to Parma, to lead the city's defense during the imperial siege. In 1251 he was named patriarch of Aquileia, but was consecrated only five years later. He also led the anti-Hohenstaufen party in the region when Frederick's heir, Conrad IV of Germany, incited the Istrian communes to revolt.

Gregorio also participated in the "crusade" against Ezzelino III da Romano, leading personally the defense of Padua in September 1255 and sending troops to the Guelph faction until 1257. He was also able to occupy the Austrian enclave of Pordenone in 1262. Once the Ghibelline menace of Ezzelino had disappeared, he attacked Ulrich III of Carinthia and Albert I of Gorizia. He was however captured by the latter at Villanova dello Judrio of 20 July 1267, being freed only after he promised to sign a treaty of peace  (1269). Nevertheless, Gregorio resumed the military operations, but died before he could launch another attack.

Previously, Gregorio had signed a treaty with the Republic of Venice which set the respective areas of influence in the contented Istrian region.

Sources

Further reading

 

1200s births
1269 deaths
People from Ferentino
Patriarchs of Aquileia